Asif Ali may refer to:

Asif Ali (actor) (born 1986), Indian film actor and producer
Asif Ali (cricketer, born 1991), batsman for Pakistan
Asif Ali (cricketer, born 1989), Pakistani bowler for Abbottabad and Federal Areas
Asif Ali, an actor in Wrecked and WandaVision

See also 
Asaf Ali (1888–1953), Indian independence fighter, lawyer and ambassador
Asif Ahmad Ali (born 1940), Pakistani politician
Asif Ali Khan Durrani, Pakistani ambassador
Asif Ali Malik (born 1948), Pakistani lawyer
Asif Ali Zardari (born 1955), former Pakistani president